James William Drought (November 4, 1931 – June 2, 1983) was an American author, magazine editor, speech writer and press officer for the Office of Public Relations.

Biography 
Drought was born in Aurora, Illinois, and grew up near Chicago. From 1952 to 1954 he served in the U.S. Army in the 82nd Airborne Division as a paratrooper stationed at Fort Bragg, North Carolina. In 1960, he moved to Norwalk, Connecticut, with his family, where he was a magazine editor in New York City, New York.

In 1969 one of his books was adapted to the movie The Gypsy Moths (1969) featuring Burt Lancaster, Deborah Kerr, and Gene Hackman in starring roles.  A complete collection of his works is preserved at the Mugar Memorial Library in the Special Collections Department at Boston University.

He died on June 2, 1983.

Publications
 Boxed in by the Rich, A Parody (1950)
 The Wedding, A Play for Voices (1953)
 The Gypsy Moths, A Fable (1955)
 Memories of A Humble Man, An Irony (1957)
 Mover, A Modern Tragedy  (1959)
 ii A Duo, A Story By Two Men (1961)
 The Secret, An Oratorio of Protest (1962)
 The Enemy, A Personal Reminiscence (1964)
 Drugoth, Biography of a Private Person (1965)
 ALIVEMOVIEBOOK, An Adaptation (1967)
 The Master, A Chronicle (1970)
 Sonny Davis Televised, A Comedy (1972) 
 Blessed Bob Bunyan, An Inquiry (1974)
 The Book of Names, A Novel-Verite (1976)
 Superstar for President, A Satire (1978)
 Writer in Exile, A Mystery (1980)
 So Long Chicago, A Novel of Improvisational Comedy (1982)
 Queen of Spades, (unpublished) (1983)

References

External links
James Drought - American Author
 An Introduction to James Drought
IMDB.com

1931 births
1983 deaths
People from Aurora, Illinois
Place of death missing